George Shiffer McCaa (March 8, 1884 – November 28, 1960) was an American football, basketball, and baseball player and coach.  He played college football at Lafayette College as a fullback in 1908 and 1909.  McCaa served as the head football coach at Whitman College in 1910, at Lafayette from 1912 to 1913, and at Muhlenberg College from 1914 to 1915.  At Lafayette he also played basketball and baseball, and ran track.  McCaa was born on March 8, 1884, in Wilkes-Barre, Pennsylvania.  He died at the age of 76 on November 28, 1960, at Allegheny General Hospital in Pittsburgh.

Head coaching record

Football

References

External links
 

1884 births
1960 deaths
American football fullbacks
Lafayette Leopards baseball players
Lafayette Leopards football coaches
Lafayette Leopards football players
Lafayette Leopards men's basketball players
Muhlenberg Mules baseball coaches
Muhlenberg Mules football coaches
Muhlenberg Mules men's basketball coaches
Whitman Fighting Missionaries football coaches
College men's track and field athletes in the United States
Sportspeople from Wilkes-Barre, Pennsylvania
Track and field athletes from Pennsylvania
Players of American football from Pennsylvania
American men's basketball players
Basketball coaches from Pennsylvania
Basketball players from Pennsylvania